All Black and Hairy is the first and only album by Gravedigger V, released in 1984 before the band disbanded.

Critical reception
AllMusic called the album "both perfectly named and perfectly performed -- if it's nothing but a revivalist approach at heart, it's such a damn entertaining one that there's no cause for complaint." Trouser Press called it "groovy, authentic-sounding (credit the production by label owner Greg Shaw) garage punk with convincing ’60s clumsiness and sincerity." Maximumrocknroll wrote that "the high points here are an amazingly snot-nosed vocalist with sneering ’60s inflections, some strong original songwriting, an appropriately tinny 'mono' production, and an above-average choice of tunes to cover."

Track listing 

Side A
All Black And Hairy (Lord Sutch)
Tomorrow Is Yesterday (Friedman)
No Good Woman
Do Like Me
Hate
She's A Cur (Leighton, Ward)

Side B
Searching (Revercomb, Allen)
She's Gone (Leighton, Friedman)
Night Of The Phantom (Larry And The Blue Notes)
Don't Tread On Me (K. Massengill)
One Ugly Child (Bright)
She Got (Friedman)
Stoneage Stomp (Leighton, Friedman)

Personnel
Tom Ward – vocals, bass
David Anderson – drums
John Hanrattie – guitars
Ted Friedman – lead vocals, lead guitars
Leighton – vocals
Gary Stern – engineer
Greg Shaw – producer

References

1984 albums